Luca Agoletto (born 11 September 1962) is an Italian paralympic rower who won a gold medal at the 2008 Summer Paralympics.

References

External links
 

1962 births
Living people
Paralympic rowers of Italy
Paralympic gold medalists for Italy
Medalists at the 2008 Summer Paralympics
Paralympic medalists in rowing
rowers at the 2008 Summer Paralympics